Kundian Junction railway station is located in Kundian Pakistan. Kundian Jn. is in midway of Rawalpindi-Multan  section of PR. Mianwali Express train travels to Lahore from Mari Indus, Kundian, Sargodha, Sangla Hill etc. From Kundian  Thal Express, Mehar Express, Khushhal Khan Khattak Express and Mianwali Express also pass towards various places to Multan, Karachi. There is a big Railway colony with Railway Hospital School too. There is a big Loco motive Shed in Kundian too.

See also
 List of railway stations in Pakistan
 Pakistan Railways
Note: In 2011, trains (i.e, Mari Indus express, Sargodha rail car, Thal express) running from this junction were suspended due to railway crisis. In 2019, Mari Indus express (Mari Indus-Lahore) & Thal express (rawalpindi-multan) were restored.In addition to this 2 new trains including Mianwali Express Naizi Express (mari indus lahore) were included in to the railway system.  Since then this station has re-opened

References

External links
Official Web Site of Pakistan Railways

Railway stations in Mianwali District
Railway stations on Sangla Hill–Kundian Branch Line
Railway stations on Kotri–Attock Railway Line (ML 2)